Abhay Rustum Sopori (born 7 June 1979) is an Indian Santoor player, music composer and conductor. He is the son of Santoor player Pandit Bhajan Sopori, known for his versatility, innovations and experimentation. Sopori has received awards in recognition of his contribution in the field of music, and is one of the youngest recipients of awards such as 'Bharat Shiromani Award' & 'Ustad Bismillah Khan Yuva Puraskar'. Abhay was invited to speak at the international conference TEDx.

Life and career

Early life and family 

Abhay Rustum Sopori was born on 7 June 1979 in the city of Srinagar situated in the Kashmir valley of Jammu and Kashmir, India into a Kashmiri Pandit family. His parents were musician Bhajan Sopori and Aparna Sopori, a professor of English literature. He learned Santoor under the traditional Guru-Shishya Parampara of his mystic Shaivite-Sufi tradition from his grandfather Shamboo Nath Sopori, hailed as the "Father of Classical Music" in Jammu and Kashmir and his father Bhajan Sopori.

Abhay represents the Sufiana Gharana of Kashmir, coming from a family of traditional Santoor players, spanning over nine generations spread over more than 300 years.

Sopori has a bachelor's and master's degree in Music from Pracheen Kala Kendra, Chandigarh, India and holds bachelors in Commerce from Delhi University and Computers from Indira Gandhi National Open University.

Career 
Sopori was trained in Indian classical music from his childhood, as well as Western and Sufiana music. Apart from santoor, he also learned vocals, Indian classical sitar, Sufiana sitar and piano. He recorded his first song at the age of 3 for a musical feature for All India Radio composed by his father and was also part of his father's grand choral presentation featuring over 8000 voices in Srinagar Kashmir in 1985.

He presented his first Choral presentation featuring over 100 singers in October 2005 in Kashmir organised by Sopori Academy of Music And Performing Arts (SaMaPa). Abhay's J&K Folk Music Ensembles (Soz-o-Saaz) have also been presented at various other festivals and conferences, which include the 'Jammu & Kashmir Festival' presented at the Indira Gandhi National Center for the Arts in New Delhi in 2009 and Ganesh Kala KridaRangmanch in Pune in 2010, which left the audiences captivated and mesmerized. Abhay's Classical fusions have also received rave reviews.

In 2000, Abhay started his musical work in Kashmir performing for the youth across the Valley promoting Indian classical music and culture and is credited with changing the entire cultural scenario of Jammu & Kashmir bringing the youth together through music. His concerts in border areas of J&K have been attended by over 20,000 people.

Since his debut as a Classical Santoor player in mid 1990s, Abhay has performed in prestigious festivals across India and around the world in countries like the United States, Russia, Brazil, Mauritius, Japan, South Korea, Singapore, Germany, France, Italy, Slovakia, Czech Republic, Hungary, Sweden, Switzerland, Spain, Slovenia, Ukraine, Thailand, Malaysia, Vietnam, Morocco, Iran, Israel, Bahrain, Dubai, etc.

Sopori introduced the concept of 'Sufi Music Ensemble' titled 'Sufi Kinship®’ in 2011 featuring 35 musicians and Santoor led an Indian Classical Music Ensemble in 2014 featuring 25 musicians and performed at various concerts across India.

He scored the music for the fusion composition titled Haftrang (seven colors in Kashmiri) in 2013 performed by the Bavarian State Orchestra of Germany, together with his Kashmiri folk music ensemble Soz-o-Saaz, giving international recognition to Kashmiri music. The concert was telecast live in more than 100 countries. The orchestra consisted of around 100 musicians.

Sopori has also done international collaborations including presentations with the Austrian Vienna Boys Choir, Moroccan Lutist Haj Younis, Iranian santoor player Darius Saghafi, American dulcimer player Malcom Dalgish, French clarinetist Laurent Clouet & others.

He has held various cultural positions like:

 General Secretary, SaMaPa (Sopori Academy of Music And Performing Arts) (SaMaPa), one of the most prominent and prestigious music academies and organizations of India (2005 onwards)
 Member of Central Committee, J&K Academy of Art, Culture & Languages, Govt. of J&K (2016 onwards)
 Member of General Council, J&K Academy of Art, Culture & Languages, Govt. of J&K (2016 onwards)
 Member, Editorial Board, JK Music Initiative, Music Journal by Department of Higher Education, Govt. of J&K (2018 onwards)
 Visiting Faculty, University of Massachusetts, Amherst USA (2004)

Artistry

Style of Santoor 
Sopori's Classical Santoor performance is marked by mellifluous playing, lightning tempo, clarity and accuracy of Indian Classical Raga exposition and adoption of the Sopori Baaj (style), the unique and systematic format of Santoor playing created by his father.

Presentation of Dhrupad system along with the accompaniment of the Pakhawaj is also a special characteristic of his Sopori Baaj and performance. He sings the compositions along with their instrumental rendering reviving his traditional Shaivaite - Sufi Santoor Parampara.

Innovations & creations 
Sopori continues to innovate and experiment with Santoor to further extend its dimensions. He has introduced the Open String Concept, together with the Enhanced Sustain Technique, giving a new dimension to the sound. He also established the concept of ‘'Gayan-Vadan Baaj'’ (vocal-instrumental system) and ‘'Been Ang. He invented, designed and introduced a 30-stringed instrument in 2004 named as Sur-Santoor.

Sopori has been instrumental in reviving the old Sufiana compositions of his predecessors and adopted them in the Indian Classical scenario and also composed and introduced new Khayal compositions. Raga Nirmalkauns named after Shri Mataji Nirmala Devi and Raga MahaKali named after Goddess Mother Kali are Abhay's newly composed Ragas.

 Composer 
Abhay has composed music for Films, Telefilms, Short Films, Serials (TV & Radio) and Documentaries. He recently debuted as a composer in Bollywood commercial cinema with Shikara movie and composed the Love theme song Dilbar Lagyo and the Wedding Song titled Shukrana Gul Khile.

His other work includes Mahatma, a documentary film by Government of India on Mahatma Gandhi, presented at the United Nations marking the first International Non-violence Day, the Kashmiri film Bub, and the film Ziyarat.

 Filmography 

 Television 

 Sailaab (Flood) - Composer, Singer, Doordarshan Guldasta (Flower Bouquet) - Composer, Doordarshan Tabla ka Itihas (History of Table instrument) - Composer, Radio Roshni (Light) - Composer, Doordarshan Do Sheheron Ki Kahani (Tale of Two Cities) - Composer, Doordarshan Bazm-E-Chiraghan - Singer, Composer, Doordarshan (Urdu)
Aaj Tak news channel title music, Santoor music

 Compositions 

 Albums 

 Vishuddha 1, SaMaPa, Classical SantoorVishuddha 2, SaMaPa, Classical SantoorTriveni, SaMaPa, Santoor FusionSopori Legacy, SaMaPa, Classical SantoorDancing Dewdrops, Virgin EMI Records, Santoor Fusion (Classical)The Urban Grooves – Kashmir, Virgin EMI Records, Santoor Fusion (Kashmiri)Tum Jo Mile, Virgin EMI Records, Santoor FusionVoyage au coeur de l'Inde, Virgin EMI Records, Santoor FusionSpirit of Doon, Virgin EMI Records, ComposerFragrances of Cabella, SaMaPa, Classical SantoorVoice of Strings, Mars Music, Classical SantoorNew Strings, Mars Music, Classical SantoorSantoor Vadan, NITL India, Classical SantoorShehjaar, Saregama& SaMaPa, ComposerAalav, Saregama & SaMaPa, Co-composer Runjhun, Saregama & SaMaPa, Co-composer Kabir Bani, SaMaPa, Composer & Singer Meera Bhajans, SaMaPa, Composer & Singer Ma Haro Meri Peer, SaMaPa, Co-composer Ajab Nain Tere, SaMaPa, Co-composerAnwari MuhammadiSAW, SaMaPa, Composer Jai Baba Barfani (Shri Amarnath Ji Shrine Board), Co-composer & Singer Amarnath Yatra, Times Music, Co-composer & Singer Singles 

 Vaishno Janto Folk Instrumental version, Doordarshan, Govt. of India, Co-composer Ek Bharat Shresth Bharat, All India Radio, Co-composer & Singer Challa, T-Series (company), Composer Aao Kadam Badhayain (SaMaPa), Composer Dua (SaMaPa), Composer & Singer Wohi Khuda Hai (SaMaPa), Composer Nai Subha - Kashmiri (SaMaPa), Composer & Singer Nai Subha - Dogri (SaMaPa), Composer & Singer Hazrat-e-NabiSAW (SaMaPa), ComposerJannat-e-Kashmir (SaMaPa), Co-composer & Singer Awards and accolades 

 2020: Mahatma Gandhi Seva Medal - Gandhi Global Peace Award by United Nations accredited Gandhi Global Family - Jammu and Kashmir (union territory)
 2019: Top Grade Artist by All India Radio, Govt. of India - Delhi
 2018: Raag Ranjani Sangeet Bhushan Award - Delhi
 2018: Pt. Man Mohan Bhatt Award - Rajasthan
 2017: Atal Shikhar Samman - Presented at the Parliament of India - Delhi
 2017: Dr. S. Radhakrishnan National Media Award - Delhi
 2016: State Icon - title by Election Commission of India - Jammu and Kashmir (union territory)
 2016: Pride of Paradise Award - Jammu and Kashmir (union territory)
 2015: Pride of India Award - Delhi
 2015: Sangeet Gaurav Samman - Delhi
 2014: Madras Music Academy Award - Chennai
 2014: Sangeet Mani Award - Delhi
 2013: Indian Fine Arts Society Award - Kingdom of Bahrain
 2013: Sabzaar Award of Excellence - Jammu and Kashmir (union territory)
 2012: Kashmir Kirti Samman - Pune.
 2011: J&K Civil Award - Highest Civilian Award of Jammu & Kashmir by J&K Govt. - Srinagar 2011: Kashmir Educational, Cultural & Social Society (KECSS) Award - Delhi
 2010: Glory of India Award - United Kingdom
 2010: Best Citizens of India Award - Delhi
 2010: Raag Ranjani Sangeet Shree Award - Delhi
 2010: Bharat Shiromani Award - Delhi
 2009: Ma Sharika Samman - Haryana
 2008: National Dogri Award - Jammu and Kashmir (union territory)
 2007: Pt. Gama Maharaj Sangeet Bhushan Samman - Delhi
 2007: Excellence Award - Delhi
 2006: Sangeet Natak Akademi’s first 'Ustad Bismillah Khan Yuva Puraskar - Delhi
 2006: Young India Award - Jammu and Kashmir (union territory)
 2005: Juenjo Korean International Heritage Award - Seoul, South Korea
 2004: Kalawant Samman - Mumbai

 Philanthropic contributions 
Sopori started working with the State Government of Jammu and Kashmir to expand and accomplish his grandfather's dream and after several years of hard work and dedication, he was able to introduce music as a formal subject in the educational setup of Jammu and Kashmir. The initiative also called The Music Initiative of Abhay Rustum Sopori'' has been a major step in the educational system of the state (now union territory) creating new streams in colleges and universities and, offering new job opportunities for the youth.

Sopori is a strong believer of peace and humanity and has been promoting the same ideology also preached by Mahatma Gandhi through music. He has introduced the concept of 'Common Song' aimed at providing a musical healing touch in Jammu and Kashmir under the banner of SaMaPa, which include musical hits like 'Aao Kadam Badhayain', 'Mere Jannet-e-Kashmir', 'Zameen', 'Nai Subha', 'Jammu-Ane', 'Wohi Khuda Hai', 'Dua', etc.

In 2005 Abhay, along with his father, founded the music academy and organization called SaMaPa (Sopori Academy of Music And Performing Arts), which is acclaimed for its work in Delhi and J&K. Post 2005, the programmes and events have been organized under the banner of SaMaPa. Some of the festivals include SaMaPa Sangeet Sammelan (Delhi) which is considered as the topmost music festival of Delhi; SaMaPa Aalap Festival (J&K) which is one of the biggest music festivals witnessed by over 50,000 people. SaMaPa Aalap Festival is held at a number of venues including border areas, cultural centers, jails, etc. at places like Sopore, Baramulla, Kupwara, Bandipora, Budgam, Anantnag, Ganderbal, Srinagar, Jammu, Samba, Khour, RS Pora, Rajouri, Poonch, Katra, Udampur, Akhnoor, etc. The festival was started in 2006 and over the years has presented thousands of young talents of Jammu and Kashmir.

Sopori has held charity concerts for various medical and social causes and also catastrophes like Kashmir earthquake in 2005 (over INR 10 million) & Jammu and Kashmir floods in 2014 (over INR 8 million).

Gallery

References 

Living people
Recipients of the Sangeet Natak Akademi Award
Santoor players
Indian male classical musicians
Indian people of Kashmiri descent
Kashmiri people
Kashmiri Pandits
Kashmiri musicians
People from Srinagar
1979 births